Pat Mckay (born May 29, 1957, Kilmarnock, Scotland, United Kingdom) is a Scottish karateka. He has a  fifth Dan black belt in karate and is the winner of multiple World Karate Championships in 1982 and 1984.

References

Further reading 
 

1977 births
Living people
Scottish male karateka
Karate coaches
Sportspeople from Kilmarnock